Daviesia mollis is a species of flowering plant in the family Fabaceae and is endemic to the south-west of Western Australia. It is a small shrub with softly-hairy foliage, scattered elliptic phyllodes, and yellow and reddish flowers.

Description

Taxonomy and naming
Daviesia mollis was first formally described in 1853 by Nikolai Turczaninow in the Bulletin de la Société Impériale des Naturalistes de Moscou. The specific epithet (mollis) means "soft".

Distribution and habitat
This daviesia grows in heath with Eucalyptus pleurocarpa and is found near Ravensthorpe, the Fitzgerald River National Park and the Stirling Range, in the Esperance Plains biogeographic region of south-western Western Australia.

Conservation status
Daviesia mollis is listed as "not threatened" by the Department of Biodiversity, Conservation and Attractions. However it is listed as "Near Threatened" on the IUCN Red List due to its restricted distribution and being fragmented into about 10 locations.

References

mollis
Eudicots of Western Australia
Plants described in 1853
Taxa named by Nikolai Turczaninow